The 1924 Chicago Bears season was their fifth regular season completed in the National Football League. The team was unable to improve on their 9–2–2 record from 1923 and finished with an 8–3–4 record under head coach George Halas earning them a second-place finish in the team standings, the fourth time in the last five years. The Bears started slow with 2 ties and a loss, but quickly gained their stride, winning 6 of their last 8 games with two ties. The Bears' only loss of the year was to the Cleveland Bulldogs, the eventual champions (the NFL officially considers the 1924 Bulldogs a different team than the Canton team from the previous year – however, all the players were the same). Despite coming in second, the Bears did defeat the cross-town rival Cardinals twice, both shutouts, and their future classic rival, the Green Bay Packers, once in a 3–0 shutout. The Sternaman brothers again carried the team, with Joe Sternaman having his best season. The younger Sternaman scored 6 touchdowns, threw for another, had 9 field goals, and 12 PATs, finishing with 75 of the Bears' 136 points.

Future Hall of Fame players
 George Halas, end
 Ed Healey, tackle
 George Trafton, center

Other leading players
 Ed Sternaman, back
 Joe Sternaman, quarterback
 Laurie Walquist, quarterback
 Hunk Anderson, guard
 John Bryan, back

Schedule

1924 NFL exhibition games

Standings

Chicago Bears
Chicago Bears seasons
Chicago Bears